Aa argyrolepis is an orchid in the genus Aa.  It grows at altitudes of 2,500 to 4,200 meters in Bolivia, Ecuador, Colombia and Peru.

References

Reichenbach, H.G. (1854) Xenia Orchidacea 1: 18.
Hammel, B.E. & al. (2003) Manual de Plantas de Costa Rica 3: 1–884. Missouri Botanical Garden Press.
Harling, G. & Andersson, L. (2005) Orchidaceae Genera Aa-Cyrtidiorchis. Flora of Ecuador 76: 225(2), Botanical Institute, University of Göteborg, Riksmuseum, Stockholm.
Dueñas Gómez, H.del C. & Fernández-Alonso, J.L. (2007) Sinopsis de la subfamilia Spiranthoideae (Orchidaceae) en Colombia, Parte I. Revista de la Academia Colombiana de Ciencias Exactas, Físicas y Naturales 31: 1-27.

argyrolepis
Plants described in 1854
Flora of Bolivia
Flora of Ecuador
Flora of Colombia
Flora of Peru